The following lists events that happened during 1995 in Laos.

Incumbents
President: Nouhak Phoumsavanh 
Prime Minister: Khamtai Siphandon

Events
 Mekong River Commission created with Cambodia, Laos, Vietnam and Thailand as the members
 U.S. lifted 20-year aid embargo

Births
4 November - Soukthavy Soundala, footballer
29 December - Phoutthasay Khochalern

Deaths
9 January - Souphanouvong, Lao communist leader (b. 1909)

References

World Atlas. Page last updated April 7, 2017.

 
Years of the 20th century in Laos
Laos
1990s in Laos
Laos